Trairi River may refer to several rivers in Brazil:

 Trairi River (Ceará)
 Trairi River (Rio Grande do Norte)
 Trairi River (Roraima), a river of Roraima